Zalissa is a genus of moths of the family Noctuidae. The genus was erected by Francis Walker in 1865.

Species
Zalissa catocalina Walker, 1865 Western Australia
Zalissa pratti (Bethune-Baker, 1906) New Guinea
Zalissa stichograpta Turner, 1943 Queensland

References

Agaristinae